The 2019–20 New Orleans Privateers women's basketball team represents the University of New Orleans during the 2019–20 NCAA Division I women's basketball season. The Privateers are led by ninth year head coach Keeshawn Davenport and play their home games at the Lakefront Arena. They are members of the Southland Conference.

Roster
Sources:

Schedule
Sources:

|-
!colspan=9 style=";"| Non-conference regular season

|-
!colspan=9 style=";"| Southland regular season

|-
!colspan=9 style=";"| Non-conference regular season

|-
!colspan=9 style=";"| Southland regular season

|-
!colspan=12 style=| 2020 Hercules Tires Southland Basketball Tournament
|-

See also
2019–20 New Orleans Privateers men's basketball team

References

New Orleans Privateers women's basketball seasons
New Orleans
New Orleans Privateers women's basketball team
New Orleans Privateers women's basketball team